KRBR (88.9 FM) was a radio station broadcasting an oldies music format. Licensed to La Barge, Wyoming, United States, the station was last owned by Nexus Broadcast.

The Federal Communications Commission (FCC) cancelled KRBR's license on October 4, 2021, due to the station failing to file an application to renew its license.

Translator
In addition to the main station, KRBR was relayed by an additional translator to widen its broadcast area. The FCC cancelled the translator's license coincident with the cancellation of KRBR's.

References

External links

RBR
Radio stations established in 2012
Radio stations disestablished in 2021
2012 establishments in Wyoming
2021 disestablishments in Wyoming
Defunct radio stations in the United States
RBR